Halgara  is a panchayat village in the state of Maharashtra, India. Administratively, Halgara is under Nilanga Taluka of Latur District in Maharashtra.

There are two villages in the Halgara gram panchayat: Halgara  and Rajewadi. Halgara is one of the largest villages in Nilanga taluka with the population of 12,000. There are many temples in Halgara village. Narsinh Mandir is one of the famous temples and one more oldest temple is Narayan Deul, which is also a famous temple.

Demographics 
In the 2001 census, the village of Halgara had 5,844 inhabitants. There are two Buddhist temples in Halgara where people go for prayer every day. .

Notes

External links 
 
 

Neighbourhoods in Latur
Villages in Latur district

Villages in Nilanga taluka